Menlo is a city in Thomas County, Kansas, United States.  As of the 2020 census, the population of the city was 33.

History
Menlo was located on the Union Pacific Railroad as it existed at the time.  The rail line subsequently moved south, and the tracks through Menlo have been removed.

A post office was opened in Menlo in 1888, and remained in operation until it was discontinued in 1992.

Geography
Menlo is located at  (39.356117, -100.724339).

Demographics

2010 census
According to the 2010 census, there were 61 people, 18 households, and 15 families residing in the city. The racial makeup of the city was 98.4% White and 1.6% Native American. Hispanic or Latino of any race were 1.6% of the population.

There were 18 households, of which 44.4% had children under the age of 18 living with them, 77.8% were married couples living together, 5.6% had a male householder with no wife present, and 16.7% were non-families. 16.7% of all households were made up of individuals, and 5.6% had someone living alone who was 65 years of age or older. The average household size was 3.39 and the average family size was 3.80.

The median age in the city was 26.5 years. 36.1% of residents were under the age of 18; 8.3% were between the ages of 18 and 24; 32.8% were from 25 to 44; 18% were from 45 to 64; and 4.9% were 65 years of age or older. The gender makeup of the city was 45.9% male and 54.1% female.

2000 census
According to the 2000 census, there were 57 people, 22 households, and 11 families residing in the city. The racial makeup of the city was 98.25% White, and 1.75% from two or more races.

There were 22 households, out of which 40.9% had children under the age of 18 living with them, 54.5% were married couples living together, and 45.5% were non-families. 40.9% of all households were made up of individuals, and 18.2% had someone living alone who was 65 years of age or older. The average household size was 2.59 and the average family size was 3.83.

In the city, the population was spread out, with 35.1% under the age of 18, 5.3% from 18 to 24, 28.1% from 25 to 44, 24.6% from 45 to 64, and 7.0% who were 65 years of age or older. The median age was 29 years. For every 100 females, there were 83.9 males. For every 100 females age 18 and over, there were 105.6 males.

The median income for a household in the city was $16,250, and the median income for a family was $27,500. Males had a median income of $26,071 versus $21,250 for females. The per capita income for the city was $9,475. There were 25.0% of families and 17.6% of the population living below the poverty line, including no under eighteens and none of those over 64.

Education
School unification consolidated Menlo, Rexford and Selden schools forming USD 316 Golden Plains. The Golden Plains High School mascot is Bulldogs.

Menlo High School was closed through school unification. The Menlo High School mascot was Menlo Tigers.

References

Further reading

External links
 Menlo - Directory of Public Officials
 USD 316, local school district
 Menlo city map, KDOT

Cities in Kansas
Cities in Thomas County, Kansas